Zambezi Fm is a commercial radio station located in the tourist capital of Zambia Livingstone  the station currently covers Livingstone, Kazungula, Zimba and parts of Kalomo, including parts of Western Zimbabwe, Eastern Botswana and Northern Namibia and is the only commercial radio station in Zambia that broadcasts to communities that live and work on the borders of these 4 neighbouring countries.

History 
The radio station was founded in August 2006, initially started broadcasting on 107.5 and was moved to 107.7  and currently broadcasting on 94.1 MHz

Programs
The radio station broadcasts in English which is the official language in Zambia and also broadcasts in Silozi, Tonga, Nyanja and Bemba plus other local language upon request from the public.

The station's main program is the Boilling Point that runs for half an hour every Tuesdays and Thursdays 09:30 to 11:00. Other shows include;

 The News
 The Morning Devotion
 Focus on Islam
 The Mighty Breakfast show
 Appointment with the doctor.
 African Safari
 BBC Focus on Africa
 Yellow Sunrise
 Chanters Experience
 Fight 2 O 5
 Zed Showcase

External links  
 Facebook Page
 Twitter Account

References

Radio stations in Zambia
Radio stations established in 2006
Livingstone, Zambia
2006 establishments in Zambia